James Taylor V (1769–1848) was an American banker, Quartermaster general, and one of the wealthiest early settlers of Kentucky. He was a founder of the city of Newport, Kentucky.

Early life

Taylor was the fifth child born to James Taylor IV and his wife, Anne Hubbard Taylor in Midway, Virginia.  His father, James Taylor IV, bought  of land in Northern Kentucky from his friend George Muse, which was part of the land Muse had been awarded for his military service in the French and Indian War.

The Taylor family had two cousins, James Madison and Zachary Taylor, who later become presidents of the United States.

Newport development
On April 1, 1792, just short of his 23rd birthday, James Taylor V left his father's plantation for Kentucky accompanied by three slaves, Moses, Humphrey and Adam, along with an English Army deserter, Robert Christy, and Christy's wife and their three children. They reached Newport June 20 but couldn't find lodging, so he stayed at Fort Washington in Cincinnati.  His enslaved men worked through the summer to clear  in fields along the Licking River, plant two corn crops, and build a small cabin on lot no. 6 at the southwest corner of Second Street and Central Avenue.

James Taylor V became the driving force behind the settlement's development.  He laid out the first road to Lexington in August with Jacob and Edward Fowler.  In 1794 James Taylor tapped his connections with Kentucky's leaders to lobby at Frankfort for acts incorporating Newport and creating Campbell County, Kentucky.  The legislature established the county on December 17, 1794, from parts of Mason, Scott and Harrison Counties.  On December 14, 1795, it approved Newport's charter.

James Taylor V and Keturah Moss Leitch were married on November 15, 1795. They had 11 children, but only four survived to maturity.

In 1803, James Taylor V solicited the help of his cousin, James Madison, who was then U.S. Secretary of State, to persuade the federal government to move the Ft. Washington military post from Cincinnati to Newport. The Newport Barracks replaced Fort Washington across the river in Cincinnati, Ohio. There were but  in the original tract, which was bought from the old Colonel Taylor estate for the minimal price of $1. In 1806, two additional acres were bought for $47. Taylor was hired as the superintendent of the construction of the barracks. He was to erect three buildings.

Gen. James Taylor V was Quartermaster General and paymaster of the Northwestern Army during the War of 1812, thus Newport became a vital center for war supplies.

Death and legacy
During a storied lifetime, James Taylor V operated ferries across both the Ohio and Licking rivers, helped to found banks, invested in the mammoth Newport Manufacturing Co., operated saw and grist mills along the Licking River, was part owner of a salt-works at Grants Lick, Ky., ran a tanning business and in his spare time was known to collect fossils and hunt buffalo at Big Bone Lick in Boone County.

James Taylor V and his wife were members of St. Paul's Episcopal Church, Newport, on the Courthouse Square. He and his wife Keturah were laid to rest at the Taylor Family Plot Evergreen Cemetery, Southgate, Ky. At his death, James Taylor V was said to be one of the wealthiest men in the state of Kentucky, with an estate valued at more than $4 million.

In the mid-19th century, Newport became a hub for trade, industry and culture. Just a few years later, Gen. Taylor's grandson established the wealthy area of East Row, a collection of elegant homes. Today, the East Row local Historic District is the second largest local district in Kentucky and the Taylor Mansion is the district's oldest house.  Taylor is the namesake of the General James Taylor Park.

Bellevue (the Taylor mansion) was listed on the National Register of Historic Places on April 22, 1976.

References

Newport History article

External links
 Newport Manufacturing Company
Kentucky Historical Marker Database, James Taylor

1769 births
1848 deaths
American people of Scotch-Irish descent
People from Kentucky in the War of 1812
United States Army generals
People from Virginia
People from Newport, Kentucky
18th-century American Episcopalians
19th-century American Episcopalians
British North American Anglicans
Quartermasters